The Midwest Archives Conference (MAC) is a regional archivist association serving the Midwestern region of the United States. MAC was founded in 1972 and held its first fall meeting in the Bismarck Hotel in Chicago, Illinois. While MAC has over 800 members from various states and countries, the MAC region is composed of Illinois, Indiana, Iowa, Kansas, Kentucky, Michigan, Minnesota, Missouri, Nebraska, North Dakota, South Dakota, Ohio, and Wisconsin. MAC holds annual conferences with roundtables, panels, and workshops targeted towards archivists, curators, and librarians. Conferences have addressed such topics as federal funding for archives, documenting social history through the records of various ethnic groups, conservation, and data reporting standards for archival institutions. Other presentations have discussed how an archives can tie into their parent institution's anniversaries and big events, or how to make popular music collections a part of your archives. Annual meetings include informational sessions and notable plenary speakers, such as Pulitzer Prize winning author Leon Dash, who spoke at the 2006 Annual Meeting in Bloomington, Illinois. Annual conferences also often include themes, such as "Documenting Rural America" (the theme of the 1986 conference held in Hudson, Wisconsin.

History 
The Midwest Archives Conference officially began in May 1972 with 111 members although the idea of a regional conference had been discussed as early as the 1971 Society of American Archivists meeting in San Francisco. At a second meeting on September 29–30 MAC adopted a constitution, amendments, and elected officers and Council members. The MAC Newsletter began quarterly publication in January 1973. Due to the efforts of Mary Lynn Ritzenthaler and others MAC began publishing its scholarly journal, The Midwestern Archivist (later Archival Issues), in 1976 . An early review of The Midwestern Archivist by Trudy Huskamp Peterson notes that the first two issues included only articles and book reviews, with plans to include additional material in later issues.

Publications 
MAC offers the following publications:

The Midwestern Archivist (1976–1991)
Archival Issues (1992–current) 
MAC Newsletter (1973–current)

MAC presidents 
1972–1975: Archie Motley
1975–1977: Jacqueline Haring
1977–1979: Mary Ann Bamberger
1979-1981: Nicholas Burckel
1981–1983: Patrick Quinn
1983–1985: James Fogerty
1985–1987: Mary Janzen
1987–1989: William Maher
1989–1991: Nancy Lankford
1991–1993: Valerie Gerrard Browne
1993–1995: J. Frank Cook
1995–1997: Mark Greene
1997–1999: Pat Michaelis
1999–2001: Frank Boles
2001–2003: Cheri Thies
2003–2005: Steve McShane
2005–2007: Elisabeth Wittman
2007–2009: Dennis Meissner
2009–2011: Tanya Zanish-Belcher
2011-2013: Ellen Swain
2013–2015: Amy Cooper Cary
2015–2017: Jennifer Johnson
2017–2019: David McCartney
2019–2021: Erik Moore

References

External links 

Archival Issues
MAC Newsletter

Academic conferences
Archivist associations
Recurring events established in 1972
Midwestern United States
1972 establishments in the United States
Professional associations based in the United States
Organizations established in 1972